Pyrausta homonymalis is a moth in the family Crambidae. It was described by Eugene G. Munroe in 1976. It is found in North America, where it has been recorded from Missouri to Virginia, Mississippi and Florida, west to Texas.

Adults are on wing from May to June.

References

Moths described in 1976
homonymalis
Moths of North America